is a Japanese manga series written and illustrated by NAOE. It has been serialized in Square Enix's shōnen manga magazine Monthly GFantasy since April 2020.

Publication
Square Enix has collected its chapters into individual tankōbon volumes. The first volume was released on September 26, 2020. As of January 27, 2023, six volumes have been released.

In North America, the manga is licensed for English release by Square Enix Manga & Books.

Volume list

Reception
As of October 2021, the first three volumes had over 250,000 copies in circulation. By December 2022, the manga had over 1 million copies in circulation.

References

Further reading

External links
  
 

Extraterrestrials in anime and manga
Gangan Comics manga
Science fantasy anime and manga
Shōnen manga